Alaska Aces may refer to:
Alaska Aces (ECHL), American ice hockey team
Alaska Aces (PBA), Filipino basketball team
Alaska's Clear and Equitable Share (ACES), a taxation structure in the state of Alaska